Matthew J. Kirby is an American author of several middle grade children's books. His debut novel, The Clockwork Three, is a children's historical fantasy set in a fictional American city in the late 19th century. It was inspired by a newspaper article Kirby came across in history class in college.

Life
Kirby was born in Utah. As the son of a naval officer, he had the opportunity to live in various parts of the country, including Maryland, California, and Hawaii. As a pre-teen, he was given a set of Ursula K. Le Guin's Earthsea books. As he read a particular passage, he was struck by her use of language and knew he wanted to become a writer. He earned his bachelor's degree in history at Utah State University and went on to earn his master's degree in school psychology. His early writing endeavors were more tailored to adults in the form of poetry and short fiction, but he eventually settled into writing for young people as he discovered many of his ideas were more "suited for a younger audience."

In 2010, his first book, The Clockwork Three, was published by Scholastic Press, and was named one of Publishers Weekly's 2010 Flying Starts.  His second book, Icefall, about a Viking princess, won the 2012 Edgar Award for Juvenile Fiction.

He currently lives near Salt Lake City, Utah with his wife, Jaime.

Works

Novels
 The Clockwork Three (2010)
 Icefall (2011)
 Infinity Ring: Book 5: Cave of Wonders (2013)
 The Lost Kingdom (2013)
 The Quantum League: Spell Robbers (2014)
 The Dark Gravity Sequence, Book 1: The Arctic Code (2015)
 The Dark Gravity Sequence, Book 2: Island of the Sun (May 2016)
 The Dark Gravity Sequence, Book 3: The Rogue World (June 2017)
 Last Descendants (September 2016)
 A Taste For Monsters (September 2016)
 Last Descendants, Book 2: Tomb of the Khan (December 2016)
 Last Descendants; Book 3: Fate of the Gods (December 2017)
 Assassin's Creed Valhalla: Geirmund's Saga (November 2020)

Poetry
 "In Their Element" (as M.J. Kirby) (2005)

Short fiction
 "Letters on Natural Magic" (2007)

References

External links

 

American male writers
Living people
American children's writers
Edgar Award winners
Year of birth missing (living people)